Adie Arsham bin Muhammad Salleh (born 6 January 1988) is a Bruneian footballer who plays as a striker. He currently has 10 caps for the Brunei national football team.

Club career
He previously played for March United, then QAF FC in the Brunei Liga Premier I and later Brunei Super League until 2014. In amongst a pool of strikers in Cameroonian import Viban Bayong, captain Riwandi Wahit and Hamizan Aziz Sulaiman, he nevertheless managed a healthy goals return for the three-time champions, averaging 7 a season.

Adie was one of a host of QAF players to move to Jerudong FC in 2015 after their former team declined to continue playing in the Bruneian top flight. He was constantly overlooked in place of Hardi Bujang and Bazli Said and only managed one goal against Kilanas FC on 15 June.

Adie transferred to newly promoted Al-Idrus FC in the Brunei Premier League in 2016. He finished the season with 10 goals.

International career
Adie played for the Brunei national football team while the team was represented by his then club QAF FC in 2006 and 2009. He scored his first international goal against Nepal in the 2006 AFC Challenge Cup on 4 April. He scored a brace in Brunei's 2–3 win against Timor-Leste on 12 November in the 2007 AFF Championship qualifying.

International goals

Honours
QAF FC
 Brunei Premier League (3): 2005–06, 2007–08, 2009–10
 Brunei League Cup (2): 2008, 2009

Personal life
His brother is Bruneian international footballer Khayrun Salleh.

References

External links

1988 births
Living people
Association football midfielders
Bruneian footballers
Brunei international footballers